The 2000 Belarusian Premier League was the tenth season of top-tier football in Belarus. It started on April 15 and ended on November 4, 2000. BATE Borisov were the defending champions.

Team changes from 1999 season
Svisloch-Krovlya Osipovichi and Molodechno, who finished 15th and 16th respectively, relegated to the First League. They were replaced by 1999 First League winners Kommunalnik Slonim and runners-up Vedrich-97 Rechytsa, who previously played in top league as Vedrich Rechytsa.

Overview
Slavia Mozyr won their 2nd champions title and qualified for the next season's Champions League. The championship runners-up BATE Borisov, 1999–2000 Cup winners Belshina Bobruisk and UEFA Fair Play ranking winners Shakhtyor Soligorsk qualified for UEFA Cup. Due to Premiere League reduction from 16 to 14 teams starting with next season, three lowest placed teams were relegated: Lida, Torpedo-Kadino Mogilev and Kommunalnik Slonim. As of 2010, this was the last season in top league for either relegated team.

Teams and venues

Table

Results

Belarusian clubs in European Cups

Top scorers

See also
2000 Belarusian First League
1999–2000 Belarusian Cup
2000–01 Belarusian Cup

External links
RSSSF

Belarusian Premier League seasons
1
Belarus
Belarus